Daniel Isiagi Opolot  (born 19 December 1995)  is a Ugandan footballer who plays for Jomo Cosmos FC in South Africa and the Uganda national team (the "Cranes") as a striker.

Club career
Daniel has played club football in SC Victoria University, Kampala City Council, Proline FC, Al Nasr and currently in Jomo Cosmos FC in South Africa.

Proline FC
He joined Proline FC in 2016 from Kampala City Council  in the 2017/2018 season he scored 10 goals in 17 appearances.

Al Nasr
In July 2018 Dan joined Al nasr.

URA FC
In September 2019, Daniel joined U.R.A FC.

National team
Daniel made his Uganda national team debut against    South Sudan  on 8 December 2017.

Lifestyle
Daniel is a son to Mr. Isiagi  Patrick Opolot and Miss Josephine Pedune.

Honors and achievements
Victoria University
CECAFA Nile Basin Cup:1 :2014

Kampala Capital City Authority FC
Ugandan Super League: 1
2016

National team
 3rd place CECAFA Cup:1 2017

References

External links

1995 births
Living people
Ugandan footballers
SC Victoria University players
Kampala Capital City Authority FC players
Uganda international footballers
Association football forwards
People from Bukedea District